Special Effects is the fifteenth studio album by American rapper Tech N9ne. It was released on May 4, 2015, by Strange Music. The album is broken up into several portions representing days of the week, with collaborations with artists including Corey Taylor, B.o.B, Lil Wayne, 2 Chainz, T.I., Hopsin, E-40, Yo Gotti, Audio Push and Eminem, among others. The album also features fellow Strange Music artists Krizz Kaliko, Big Scoob and Ces Cru. Production on the album was handled by Seven, Strange Music's in-house producer, Excision along with  Joseph Bishara who was the composer of Insidious and The Conjuring.

Critical reception

Special Effects was met with generally positive reviews from music critics. David Jeffries of AllMusic said, "Sticking to his guns with angry, soul-searching lyrics spewing out while the high-powered crossover collaborations fly about, Tech N9ne skillfully rides his career trajectory as it soars ever upwards with Special Effects, an album that's powerful more than purposeful, plus a therapy session where all the party people can sing along." Eric Diep of HipHopDX praised the production, and said, "Casual listeners — who are more familiar with his Hip Hop catalogue — will likely be turned off by the handful of straight-up rap records. His core audience, though, will revel in the album's moments like the return of "Psycho Bitch" with a crazy storytelling verse from Hopsin over sinister production." Michael Blair of XXL said, "Steadily nearing the fine line between underground and mainstream for years now, Tech’s 15th studio album finds itself as the apex of where the two classifications meet and invite both the well-acquainted enthusiast and the curious onlooker."

Commercial performance
The album debuted at number 4 on the Billboard 200, selling 60,000 copies in the United States. In its second week of sales, the album sold 14,000 copies in the United States.

Track listing

Charts

Weekly charts

Year-end charts

References

2015 albums
Tech N9ne albums
Albums produced by Seven (record producer)